Nitrochlorobenzene may refer to:

 2-Nitrochlorobenzene
 3-Nitrochlorobenzene
 4-Nitrochlorobenzene